The following is a list of MTV Asia Awards winners for Favorite Female Artist

References

MTV Asia Awards